The Stuers Islands are an uninhabited archipelago in the Louisiade Archipelago.
Politically, they are part of Milne Bay Province in southeastern Papua New Guinea.

The islands are located 16 km southeast of Wari. Quessant (Tariwerwi) is another 16 km to the southeast. The archipelago consists of two islands, Marai (29 ha ) and Taliwewai (4.6 ha). Marai is the larger of the two islands. It is 20 m high. Taliwewai is 1.7 km north-east and is 12 m high. In the West of the Stuers Islands is a large area with reefs and shoals called Uluma reefs.

References

Islands of Milne Bay Province
Louisiade Archipelago
Uninhabited islands of Papua New Guinea